The Atlacomulco Group is an alleged Mexican political organization made up of powerful political figures within the Institutional Revolutionary Party (PRI), who have denied its existence. The group is alleged to be based in Atlacomulco and to have been very influential in the politics of Mexico State and the federal government. However, the most influential people linked to the group, such as Isidro Fabela, Carlos Hank González, Enrique Peña Nieto and Arturo Montiel have denied its existence or refused to confirm its existence. The group was considered to be one of the pillars of the PRI.

Origins

The name "" was first used in local newspaper reports discussing "men from Atlacomulco" who were beginning to dominate state and federal political posts. It is claimed that the group has its origins with the political connections of Maximino Montiel Olmos, the grand-uncle of Arturo Montiel Rojas; to people such as  Lucindo Cárdenas, Rafael Suárez Ocaña and Silviano Díaz Cid.  However, the group as a widespread political force was established by Isidro Fabela.  Fabela was governor of the State of Mexico from 1942 to 1945, during which time he started an educational movement which culminated in the Insitituto Cientifico Literario, today the Universidad Autónoma del Estado de México. He also founded several newspapers and was one of the founding members of the Ateneo de la Juventud.

The Grupo Atlacomulco has operated mostly to get its members into high positions in both the state and federal governments. Fabela was instrumental in the political rise of Salvador Sánchez Colín, Alfredo del Mazo Vélez and Carlos Hank González from the 1950s to the 1970s. At one point in the 20th century, the group had members in various state governments in central Mexico and occupied key positions in the federal government. In the State of Mexico, it is estimated that 80% of government posts were held by members. Their influence even had one of their members nominated to become the first bishop of Toluca in the 1950s. However the influence of the Grupo began to diminish in the 1980s with the waning of the PRI. With the death of Hank in 2001, the group is now supposed to be leaderless, even though it is still alleged to be a strong force in politics and even to have connections to drug trafficking. The ex-president of Mexico (2012-2018) and former governor of the State of Mexico (2005-2011) Enrique Peña Nieto, is rumored to be associated with the group due to this strong political ties with Arturo Montiel. Montiel was a candidate for the PRI presidential nomination in 1999, but lost due to scandal. He is considered to be the most important person in the group today.

The Coordinator of Special Procedures of the United Nations Human Rights Council, Santiago Corcuera, has accused Grupo Atlacomulco of working against human rights in Mexico, by arguing against implementing human rights guarantees to groups such as criminals and women.

References

Politics of Mexico